Méreau is a commune in the Cher department in the Centre-Val de Loire region of France.

Geography
An area of farming and forestry, comprising the main village and five other villages and hamlets, situated by the banks of the river Arnon immediately south of Vierzon, at the junction of the D320, D18e and the D918 roads. Junction 7 of the A20 is within the commune’s borders.

Population

Sights
 The church of St. Martin, dating from the nineteenth century.
 The fifteenth-century chateau of Chevilly, with a dovecote and seventeenth century mill.
 The sixteenth-century chateau of Autry.

See also
Communes of the Cher department

References

Communes of Cher (department)